

General and history

Autobiography and biography
Louis Armstrong
 
 
 
 
 
 
 
 Teachout, Terry. Pops: A Life of Louis Armstrong. (2009)
 

Count Basie
 
 
 
 
 

Art Blakey
 
 
 

John Coltrane
 
 
 
 
 
 
 
 
 
 

Bing Crosby
 Giddins, Gary. Bing Crosby: A Pocketful of Dreams (2001)
 Giddins, Gary. Bing Crosby: Swinging on a Star (2018)

Miles Davis
 
 
 
 
 

Duke Ellington
 
 
 
 
 
 Teachout, Terry. Duke. (2013)
 
 

Bill Evans
 
 

Ella Fitzgerald
 
 
 
 
 

 

Dizzy Gillespie
 
 
 
 
 

Benny Goodman
 
 
 
 
 

Billie Holiday
 
 
 
 
 
 

Pat Metheny
 Cooke, Mervyn. Pat Metheny: The ECM Years (2017)
 Niles, Richard. The Pat Metheny Interviews (2009)

Charles Mingus
 
 
 
 

Thelonious Monk
 
 
 
 

Charlie Parker
 
 
 
 
 
 
 
 
 

Art Pepper
 
 

Sonny Rollins
 
 
 
 

Fats Waller

Instruction

Instruments – history

Drums

Guitar

Piano

Trumpet

Photography

Record labels
 
 

Music bibliographies